The German nobility and royalty were status groups of the medieval society in Central Europe, which enjoyed certain privileges relative to other people under the laws and customs in the German-speaking area, until the beginning of the 20th century. 
Historically, German entities that recognized or conferred nobility included the Holy Roman Empire (962–1806), the German Confederation (1814–1866) and the German Empire (1871–1918). Chancellor Otto von Bismarck in the German Empire had a policy of expanding his political base by ennobling rich businessmen who had no noble ancestors. The nobility flourished during the dramatic industrialization and urbanization of Germany after 1850. Landowners modernized their estates, and oriented their business to an international market. Many younger sons were positioned in the rapidly growing national and regional bureaucracies, as well as in the military. They acquired not only the technical skills but the necessary education in high prestige German universities that facilitated their success. Many became political leaders of new reform organizations such as agrarian leagues, and pressure groups. Catholic nobility played a major role in the new Centre party, while Protestant nobles were especially active in the Conservative party. 
 
In August 1919, at the beginning of the Weimar Republic (1919–1933), Germany's first democratic constitution officially abolished royalty and nobility, and the respective legal privileges and immunities appertaining to an individual, a family or any heirs. 
 
Today, German nobility is no longer conferred by the Federal Republic of Germany (1949–present), and constitutionally the descendants of German noble families do not enjoy legal privileges.  Former hereditary titles are permitted as part of the surname (e.g., the aristocratic particles von and zu), and these surnames can then be inherited by a person's children. 
 
Later developments distinguished the Austrian nobility, which came to be associated with the Austrian Empire and Austria-Hungary.  The nobility system of the German Empire was similar to nobility in the Austrian Empire; both developed during the Holy Roman Empire and both ended in 1919 when they were abolished, and legal status and privileges were revoked. 

In April 1919, Austrian nobility was abolished under the First Austrian Republic (1919–1934) and, contrary to Germany, the subsequent use and legal recognition of hereditary titles and aristocratic particles and use as part of surnames was banned.  Today, Austrian nobility is no longer conferred by the Republic of Austria (1945–present), and the public or official use of noble titles as title or part of the surname, is a minor offence under Austrian law for Austrian citizens.

Principles

In Germany, nobility and titles pertaining to it were recognised or bestowed upon individuals by emperors, kings and lesser ruling royalty, and were then inherited by the legitimate, male-line descendants of the ennobled person. Families that had been considered noble as early as pre-1400s Germany (i.e., the Uradel or "ancient nobility") were usually eventually recognised by a sovereign, confirming their entitlement to whatever legal privileges nobles enjoyed in that sovereign's realm. Noble rank was usually granted to men by letters patent (see Briefadel), whereas women were members of nobility by descent or by marriage to a nobleman. Nobility was inherited equally by all legitimate descendants in the male line. 

German titles of nobility were usually inherited by all male-line descendants, although some descended by male primogeniture, especially in 19th and 20th century Prussia (e.g., Otto von Bismarck, born a baronial Junker (not a title), was granted the title of count (Graf) extending to all his male-line descendants, and later that of prince (Fürst) in primogeniture). Upon promulgation of the Weimar Constitution on 11 August 1919, all Germans were declared equal before the law. an exceptional practice regarding surnames borne by former members of the nobility: whereas the gender differentiation in German surnames, widespread until the 18th century and colloquially retained in some dialects, was abolished in Germany with the introduction of officially registered invariable surnames by the late 19th century, former noble titles transformed into parts of the surname in 1919 continue to appear in female and male forms.

Altogether abolished were titles of sovereigns, such as emperor/empress, king/queen, grand duke/grand duchess, etc. However, former titles shared and inherited by all members of the family were retained but incorporated into the surname. For instance, members of the former royal families of Prussia and Bavaria were allowed use of Prinz/Prinzessin; or Herzog/Herzogin. In the cases of the former kings/queens of Saxony and Württemberg, the ducal title borne by non-ruling cadets of their dynasties before 1919, or Herzog/Herzogin for the six deposed grand dukes (i.e., the former rulers of Baden, Hesse, Mecklenburg-Schwerin, Mecklenburg-Strelitz, Oldenburg, and Saxe-Weimar-Eisenach) and their consorts were retained.

Any dynast who did not reign prior to 1918 but had held a specific title as heir to one of Germany's former thrones (e.g., Erbprinz ("hereditary prince"))—along with any heir to a title of nobility inherited via primogeniture, and their wives—were permitted to incorporate those titles into elements of the personal surname. However, these titles became extinct upon their deaths, not being heritable. With the demise of all persons styled "crown prince" before 1918, the term Kronprinz no longer exists as a legal surname element. Traditional titles exclusively used for unmarried noblewomen, such as Baronesse, Freiin and Freifräulein, were also transformed into parts of the legal surname, subject to change at marriage or upon request.

All other former titles and nobiliary particles are now inherited as part of the surname, and remain protected as private names under the laws. Whereas the title previously prefixed the given and surname (e.g., Graf Kasimir von der Recke), the legal usage moves the former title to the surname (i.e., Kasimir Graf von der Recke). However, the pre-1919 style sometimes continues in colloquial usage. In Austria, by contrast, not only were the privileges of the nobility abolished, but their titles and nobiliary particles as well.

German nobility was not simply distinguished by noble ranks and titles, but was also seen as a distinctive ethos. Title 9, §1 of the General State Laws for the Prussian States declared that the nobility's responsibility "as the first social class in the state" was "the defence of the country, as well as the supporting of the exterior dignity and the interior constitution thereof". Most German states had strict laws concerning proper conduct, employment, or marriage of nobles. Violating these laws could result in temporary or permanent Adelsverlust ("loss of the status of nobility"). Until the late 19th century, for example, it was usually forbidden for nobles, theoretically on pain of Adelsverlust, to marry persons "of low birth". Moreover, nobles employed in menial labour and lowly trades or wage labour could lose their nobility, as could nobles convicted of capital crimes. Adelsverlust only concerned the individual who had violated nobility codes of conduct. Their kin, spouse, and living children were not affected, but children born to a man after an Adelsverlust were commoners and did not inherit the father's former nobility.

Various organisations  perpetuate the historical legacy of the former nobility, documenting genealogy, chronicling the history of noble families and sometimes declining to acknowledge persons who acquired noble surnames in ways impossible before 1919.

Marriage strategies
Many German states, however, required a marriage to a woman of elevated social status in order for a nobleman to pass on his titles and privileges to his children. In this respect, the General State Laws for the Prussian States of 1794 spoke of marriage (and children) "to the right hand". This excluded marriages with women of the lower social classes, but did not mean a woman had to come from nobility herself. Especially towards the end of the 19th century and beyond, when a new upper class of wealthy common people had emerged following industrialization, marriages with commoners were becoming more widespread. However, with few exceptions, this did not apply to higher nobility, who largely continued to marry among themselves. Upwardly mobile German families typically followed marriage strategies involving men of lower rank marrying women of higher status who brought a major dowry.

Nobiliary particles
Most, but not all, surnames of the German nobility were preceded by or contained the preposition von (meaning "of") or zu (meaning "at") as a nobiliary particle. The two were occasionally combined into von und zu (meaning "of and at"). In general, the von form indicates the family's place of origin, while the zu form indicates the family's continued possession of the estate from which the surname is drawn. Therefore, von und zu indicates a family which is both named for and continues to own their original feudal holding or residence. However, the zu particle can also hint to the split of a dynasty, as providing information on the adopted new home of one split-off branch: For instance, a senior branch owning and maybe even still residing at the place of the dynasty's origin might have been called of A-Town [{and at} A-Town] furthermore, while a new, junior branch could then have adopted the style of, say, of A-town [and] at B-ville, sometimes even dropping [and] at, simply hyphenating the names of the two places.
Other forms also exist as combinations with the definite article: e.g. "von der" or von dem → "vom" ("of the"), zu der → "zur" or zu dem → "zum" ("of the", "in the", "at the"). Particularly between the late 18th and early 20th century when an increasing number of unlanded commoners were ennobled, the "von" was typically simply put in front of a person's surname. When a person by the common occupational surname of "Meyer" received nobility, they would thus simply become "von Meyer".

When sorting noble—as well as non-noble—names in alphabetic sequence, any prepositions or (former) title are ignored.  Name elements which have developed from honorary functions, such as Schenk (short for Mundschenk, i.e., "cup-bearer"), are also overlooked. Nobiliary particles are not capitalised unless they begin a sentence, and then they are usually skipped, unless this creates confusion. In this, the German language practice differs from Dutch in the Netherlands, where the particle van is usually capitalised when mentioned without preceding given names or initials, or from Dutch in Belgium, where the name particle Van is always capitalised.

Nobiliary law today

Germany follows Salic law, as most Continental European countries. This means that nobility is inherited only in the legitimate male line, and wives of noblemen partake in their husbands' nobility for the duration of marriage and widowhood. Noblewomen who marry commoners lose their nobility and become commoners themselves, and nobility is only recovered if they remarry a nobleman.

Although nobility as a class is no longer recognised in Germany and enjoys no legal privileges, institutions exist that carry on the legal tradition of pre-1919 nobiliary law, which in Germany today is subsumed under Sonderprivatrecht or special private law. The Deutscher Adelsrechtsausschuss or German Commission on Nobiliary Law can decide matters such as lineage, legitimacy, and a person's right to bear a name of nobility, in accordance with codified nobiliary law as it existed prior to 1919. The Commission's rulings are generally non-binding for individuals and establish no rights or privileges that German authorities or courts would have to consider or observe. However, they are binding for all German nobility associations recognized by CILANE.

In 1919, nobiliary particles and titles became part of the surname. Therefore, they can be transmitted according to civil law, for example from wife to husband, to illegitimate children and by way of adoption. The only difference to normal surnames is that noble surnames are deflected according to gender.

Some impoverished nobles offered adoptions for money in the 20th century, and the adoptees adops extensively themselves, creating a "flood" of fake nobility. A noble or noble-sounding surname does not convey nobility to those not born legitimately of a noble father, and these persons are not allowed to join a nobility association. Persons who bear a noble or noble-sounding surname without belonging to the historical nobility according to Salic law are classified as Nichtadelige Namensträger, or "non-noble name-carriers". The inflation of fake nobility is one of the major concerns of the Adelsrechtsausschuss, and it is up to the commission to determine whether a person should be considered noble or non-noble.

In special cases, for example when a family is about to die out or when a daughter inherits the family estate and marries a commoner, the Adelsrechtsausschuss can grant a dispensal from Salic law, allowing for a one-time transfer of a noble surname contrary to nobiliary law, to a person considered non-noble.

The following criteria are most important in such cases:

 Danger of extinction of the relevant noble family

 Transfer or inheritance of estates to the recipient of the name, for example to the son of the daughter

 Biological relation with the family giving the name

 Noble ancestors (for example mother or grandmother)

 Proximity to the historical nobility

 Marriage to a noblewoman

 Virtuous personality and sufficient social standing

 Membership in organizations traditionally considered noble, such as certain chivalric orders.

The Adelsrechtsausschuss does not recognize ennoblements made by heads of formerly ruling houses, but the associations of the formerly ruling and mediatized houses of Germany send representatives to the commission.

This so-called "Non-Objection" (Nichtbeanstandung) results in the factual ennoblement of the recipient (even though the term is not applied), making Germany one of the few republics where it is still possible for non-nobles to join the ranks of the nobility even though there is no monarch who can ennoble anymore. However, dispensals are granted only in the most exceptional cases, as they infringe onto the rights of a theoretical future monarch.

When a person is granted a dispensal by the Adelsrechtsausschuss, he becomes the progenitor of a new noble family, which consists of all of his legitimate male-line descendants in accordance with nobiliary law. They are considered equal to nobles in all regards, and allowed to join nobility associations.

Uradel

A family whose nobility dates back to at least the 14th century may be called Uradel, or Alter Adel ("ancient nobility", or "old nobility"). This contrasts with Briefadel ("patent nobility"): nobility granted by letters patent. The first known such document is from September 30, 1360, for Wyker Frosch in Mainz. The term Uradel was not without controversy, and the concept was seen by some as an arbitrary distinction invented by the Kingdom of Prussia.

Hochadel
Hochadel ("upper nobility", or "high nobility") were those noble houses which ruled sovereign states within the Holy Roman Empire and later, in the German Confederation and the German Empire. They were royalty; the heads of these families were entitled to be addressed by some form of "Majesty" or "Highness". These were the families of kings (Bavaria, Hanover, Prussia, Saxony, and Württemberg), grand dukes (Baden, Hesse and by Rhine, Luxembourg, Mecklenburg-Schwerin, Mecklenburg-Strelitz, Oldenburg and Saxe-Weimar-Eisenach), reigning dukes (Anhalt, Brunswick, Schleswig-Holstein, Nassau, Saxe-Altenburg, Saxe-Coburg and Gotha, Saxe-Meiningen), and reigning princes (Hohenzollern-Hechingen, Hohenzollern-Sigmaringen, Liechtenstein, Lippe, Reuss, Schaumburg-Lippe, Schwarzburg, and Waldeck-Pyrmont).

The Hochadel also included the Empire's formerly quasi-sovereign families whose domains had been mediatised within the German Confederation by 1815, yet preserved the legal right to continue royal intermarriage with still-reigning dynasties (Ebenbürtigkeit). These quasi-sovereign families comprised mostly princely and comital families, but included a few dukes also of Belgian and Dutch origin (Arenberg, Croÿ, Looz-Corswarem). Information on these families constituted the second section of Justus Perthes’ entries on reigning, princely, and ducal families in the Almanach de Gotha.

During the unification of Germany, mainly from 1866 to 1871, the states of Hanover, Hesse-Kassel, Hohenzollern-Hechingen, Hohenzollern-Sigmaringen (in 1850), Schleswig-Holstein and Nassau were absorbed into Prussia. The former ruling houses of these states were still considered Hochadel under laws adopted by the German Empire.

In addition, the ruling families of Hohenzollern-Hechingen and Hohenzollern-Sigmaringen were accorded the dynastic rights of a cadet branch of the Royal House of Prussia after yielding sovereignty to their royal kinsmen. The exiled heirs to Hanover and Nassau eventually regained sovereignty by being allowed to inherit, respectively, the crowns of Brunswick (1914) and Luxembourg (1890).

Niederer Adel
Nobility that held legal privileges until 1918 greater than those enjoyed by commoners, but less than those enjoyed by the Hochadel, were considered part of the lower nobility or Niederer Adel. Most were untitled, only making use of the particle von in their surnames. Higher-ranking noble families of the Niederer Adel bore such hereditary titles as Ritter (knight), Freiherr (or baron) and Graf. Although most German counts belonged officially to the lower nobility, those who were mediatised belonged to the Hochadel, the heads of their families being entitled to be addressed as Erlaucht ("Illustrious Highness"), rather than simply as Hochgeboren ("High-born"). There were also some German noble families, especially in Austria, Prussia and Bavaria, whose heads bore the titles of Fürst (prince) or Herzog (duke); however, never having exercised a degree of sovereignty, they were accounted members of the lower nobility (e.g., Bismarck, Blücher, Putbus, Hanau, Henckel von Donnersmarck, Pless, Wrede).

Titles and ranks

The titles of elector, grand duke, archduke, duke, landgrave, margrave, count palatine, prince and Reichsgraf were borne by rulers who belonged to Germany's Hochadel. Other counts, as well as barons (Freiherren), lords (Herren), knights (Ritter) were borne by noble, non-reigning families. The vast majority of the German nobility, however, inherited no titles, and were usually distinguishable only by the nobiliary particle von in their surnames.

See also
 Feudalism
 German Mediatisation
 Holy Roman Empire
 Neues allgemeines deutsches Adels-Lexicon
 Former German nobility in the Nazi Party
 Patricianship

Notes

References

Further reading 
 Augustine, Dolores L. Patricians and Parvenus. Wealth and High Society in Wilhelmine Germany (Berg, 1994).
 Augustine, Dolores L. "Arriving in the upper class: the wealthy business elite of Wilhelmine Germany." in David Blackbourn and Richard J. Evans, eds., The German Bourgeoisie: Essays on the Social History of the German Middle Class from the Late Eighteenth to the Early Twentieth Century (1991) pp: 46-86.
 Berdahl, Robert M. The politics of the Prussian nobility: The development of a conservative ideology, 1770-1848 (Princeton UP, 2014).
 Buse, Dieter K. and Doerr, Juergen C., eds. Modern Germany: An Encyclopedia of History, People, and Culture, 1871-1990  (2 vol. Garland, 1998) pp 41–42.
 Cecil, Lamar. "The creation of nobles in Prussia, 1871-1918." American Historical Review 75.3 (1970): 757-795 online.
 D'Almeida, Fabrice. High Society in the Third Reich (2008) excerpt

 
 Hurwich, Judith J. "Marriage strategies among the German nobility, 1400-1699," Journal of Interdisciplinary History (1998) 29#2:169–195.

 Kaudelka-Hanisch, Karin. "The Titled Businessman: Prussian Commercial Councillors in the Rhineland and Westphalia during the Nineteenth Century", in David Blackbourn and Richard J. Eellung der Mediatisierten 1815–1918, Stuttgart 1957 (Göttingen ²1964). (Deals with the social and political rank of the former sovereign nobles of the Holy Roman Empire who were mediatized from 1803 to 1815.)
 Johannes Rogalla von Bieberstein: Adelsherrschaft und Adelskultur in Deutschland''. Limburg a.d.Lahn.: C.A. Starcke 1998.

External links
 Archive for Feudalism in Saxony 
 Institut Deutsche Adelsforschung (Institute for German Aristocratic Research)
 Burgen und Schlösser (Castles and Palaces of Germany)

 
Social class in Germany